The Prince R380 is a racing car built in 1965 by Prince Motor Company to compete in the Japanese Grand Prix. Following the merger of Prince Motor Company and Nissan Motors in 1966, the R380 was modified into the Nissan R380-II (also known as R380 Mk.II).

Development
In 1964, Prince had entered their new S54 Skyline GTs in the second Japanese Grand Prix, hoping to prove the performance potential of the car's new G-7 straight-6. Although the cars performed well, they were defeated by a privately entered Porsche 904, leaving the Skylines to take second through sixth positions.

Realizing the superiority of the mid-engine design used on the Porsche 904, Prince decided that a custom-built sports car would be needed to win the Japanese Grand Prix. A new aerodynamic body was built on a Brabham BT8 chassis; alloy panels were fabricated with exposed buttresses over the rear engine cover and fitted to Brabham chassis number SC-9-64.

For an engine, Prince would use the same G engine that the Skylines had used, but adapted it specifically for racing. The new unit, known as GR-8, would be a 1,996 cc straight-6 that produced . A Hewland 5-speed racing gearbox would be used in the transmission.

When Nissan took over the project, the bodywork of the R380 was completely redesigned. The rear buttresses were replaced with a flowing cockpit and engine cover, while the vents and ductwork of the car was further refined.

Racing history
Due to the cancellation of the Japanese Grand Prix in 1965, the R380 would be used by Prince to test high speed aerodynamics. This led to the car being used to break five E-class land speed records in late 1965.

For the 1966 Japanese Grand Prix at Fuji Speedway, Prince would enter four R380s, while a trio of newer Porsche 906s would also be entered. In the end, the R380s would take the overall victory, with Yoshikazu Sunako's R380 ahead of Hideo Oishi's second place R380.

Following the rebuilding of the R380s by Nissan, four cars were once again entered in the Japanese Grand Prix. However, the 906s would be able to overcome the previous year's loss, leaving the R380-IIs to settle for second, third, fourth, and sixth. The margin of victory was nearly two minutes. Nissan would later use an R380-II to set new land speed records, breaking seven records in October of that year.

Following Nissan's development of the newer R381 in 1968, the R380s were sold to privateers. Three were once again entered in the Japanese Grand Prix, where they took third, fourth, and fifth places. Two factory-entered R380s went on to finish first and second in the 1969 Chevron Paradise 6 Hour race at the Surfers Paradise International Raceway in Australia.  1969 saw one R380 taking second place in the 1000 km of Fuji race, and yet another second place in 1970 at a  event at Fuji.

In 2005, Nismo would restore an R380-II and use it for exhibition events, running alongside other cars in the R380 series.

References

External links
 
 
 
 

R380
Nissan racing cars
Group 6 (racing) cars